Patrick Huber is a German theoretical particle physicist known for his calculation of the reactor neutrino flux, and for his work in computing sensitivity of neutrino oscillation experiments and applications of reactor neutrino detection.  He is a Professor of Physics Virginia Tech and Director of Virginia Tech's Center for Neutrino Physics. In 2016 he was honored with the Breakthrough Prize in Fundamental Physics for his work on the Daya Bay Reactor Neutrino Experiment.

Education and Career 
Huber studied at the Technical University Munich, completing his diploma in 2000 and his Doctor rerum naturalium in theoretical Physics in 2003, under the supervision of Manfred Lindner.  After completing postdoctoral appointments at the University of Wisconsin–Madison and CERN he started a faculty position in the Virginia Tech Physics Department in 2008, and received tenure in 2012.  He became director of the Center for Neutrino Physics in 2017.

Awards and honours 

 2010 DOE Early Career Researcher Award
 2016 Breakthrough Prize in Fundamental Physics
 2019 Fellow of the American Physical Society

Select publications

References

External links
| Home page at Virginia Tech
| The Center for Neutrino Physics at Virginia Tech

Living people
Particle physicists
Virginia Tech faculty
21st-century German physicists
Theoretical physicists
Neutrino physicists
Fellows of the American Physical Society
Technical University of Munich alumni

Year of birth missing (living people)